"Don't Don't Tell Me No" is a song by American singer-songwriter Sophie B. Hawkins, released in November 1994 as the second single from her second studio album, Whaler (1994). The song was written by Hawkins and produced by Stephen Lipson. "Don't Don't Tell Me No" peaked at  36 on the UK Singles Chart and remained in the top 100 for five weeks.

Critical reception
On its release, Music & Media noted: "Like the wind blows the leaves off the trees, Hawkins constantly pulls pop songs out of her bag." In a review of Whaler, Jim Farber of The Daily News wrote: "Tracks like 'Right Beside You' and 'Don't Don't Tell Me No' chirp happily along with coquettish flair and great hook appeal." Dave Younk of St. Cloud Times described the song as "excellent" with "the most incredible a cappella ending that seems to pleasantly go on forever".

Track listings
CD single
 "Don't Don't Tell Me No" (album version) – 4:52
 "Right Beside You" (The Grid 7-inch mix) – 3:38
 "Right Beside You" (The Grid dub mix) – 8:40
 "Big Beautiful Bottom in My Face" – 2:55

CD and cassette single
 "Don't Don't Tell Me No" (album version) – 4:52
 "Swing from Limb to Limb (My Home Is Your Jungle)" (album version) – 4:15

CD single (UK CD2)
 "Don't Don't Tell Me No" (album version) – 4:52
 "I Need Nothing Else" (album version) – 4:15
 "Damn I Wish I Was Your Lover" (album version) – 5:24
 "Right Beside You" (The Grid 12-inch mix) – 8:35

12-inch single (UK release)
 "Don't Don't Tell Me No" (album version) – 4:52
 "Swing from Limb to Limb (My Home Is Your Jungle)" – 4:15
 "Right Beside You" (The Grid 12-inch mix) – 8:35
 "Right Beside You" (The Grid 7-inch mix) – 3:38

Personnel
Don't Don't Tell Me No
 Sophie B. Hawkins – vocals, keyboards, programming
 Stephen Lipson – bass, programming
 Peter Vettese – keyboards
 Neil Conti – drum set

Production
 Stephen Lipson – producer on "Don't Don't Tell Me No", "Right Beside You", "Swing from Limb to Limb" and "I Need Nothing Else"
 Heff Moraes – engineer on "Don't Don't Tell Me No", "Right Beside You", "Swing from Limb to Limb" and "I Need Nothing Else"
 Sophie B. Hawkins – producer, recording and mixing on "Big Beautiful Bottom in My Face"
 Rick Chertoff, Ralph Schuckett – producers of "Damn I Wish I Was Your Lover"
 Steve Churchyard, David Leonard – mixing on "Damn I Wish I Was Your Lover"
 The Grid – remixes of "Right Beside You"

Charts

References

1994 singles
1994 songs
Columbia Records singles
Song recordings produced by Stephen Lipson
Songs written by Sophie B. Hawkins
Sophie B. Hawkins songs